This is a list of seasonally allocated competition numbers that crews of WRC manufacturers opt to use. The option to choose was introduced into the World Rally Championship since . Similar to the regulation that was implemented in Formula One, only the reigning world champion is allowed to use No.1.

WRC driver numbers

Notes

References

External links
 

Numbers